The Great Dharani Sutra is a copy of the Uṣṇīṣa Vijaya Dhāraṇī Sūtra, a scripture of Mahayana Buddhism, which is considered to be one of the oldest printed texts in the world.

Discovery 

The Great Dharani Sutra was discovered in October 1966 during repairs of Seokgatap (the three-storied pagoda) in Bulguksa which is located in Korea. Joseph Needham assumed it was made between 684 and 704, but since the Dhāraṇī Sūtra was translated into Chinese from Sanskrit in 704, and Bulguksa was built in 751, it is assumed that it was built between the two periods, and is considered to be one of the oldest woodblock prints (on hanji) in the world. The text contains Chinese characters of Empress Wu which were used only when the Tang dynasty of China was ruling, so it is acknowledged to have been printed before Seokgatap was repaired. It is currently designated as National Treasure No. 126-6.

In 1966, a bundle of paper known as the "ink sheet (墨書紙片)" was found. This document was preserved in 1988–89, and in 1997–98 it was separated into 110 pages. It was interpreted in 2005 and 2007, and caused a controversy over the production age of the Great Dharani Sutra.

Justification

One reason for building a tower is to encircle the sari. The sari is largely divided into the sinsari (the remains of the Buddha) and the bubsari (the scripture). The scripture which was largely prevalent in the Unified Silla period is the "Mugujeonggwang Daedaranigyeong (無垢淨光大陀羅尼經)" translated from Chinese in 704. This scripture states that when building or repairing a tower, it is necessary to use 99 or 77 bundles of darani to put it in a small mud-tower and seal it in, which extends the life span and extinguishes all sins. In 706, the royal family of Shilla implemented the contents of this scripture in the memorial service for the king of the fleet, and in the sari locker to enter into the tower of Hwangbok for the temporal king. In other words, it depicts 99 small towers on the surface of the sari enclosure to bless the sari. After the 9th century, the expression of these small towers was established as a sari locker method that encircles 99 or 77 small towers containing Darani and spreads to the whole area of Unified Silla.

Structure 

The Great Dharani Sutra consists of 12 sheets of paper, totalling 620 cm in length and 8 cm in height. Each line contains around 8 characters. The first sheet has 56 rows and its size is 56.8 cm. The second sheet has 55 rows and its size is 53.8 cm. The third sheet has 55 rows and its size is 53.2 cm. The fourth sheet has 57 rows and its size is 52.9 cm. The fifth sheet has 56 rows and its size is 54.5 cm. The sixth sheet has 62 rows and its size is 55.1 cm. The seventh sheet has 61 rows and its size is 54.3 cm. The eighth sheet has 59 rows and its size is 55.6 cm. The ninth sheet has 60 rows and its size is 55 cm. The tenth sheet has 63 rows and its size is 54.2 cm. The eleventh sheet has 61 rows and its size is 53.9 cm. The twelfth sheet has 38 rows and its size is 43.9 cm.

A microscopic examination revealed that the papers of The Great Dharani Sutra were made as hanji, which is the traditional Korean paper handmade from mulberry trees.

Content 

"The Great Dharani Sutra" means "a Buddhist text for a clean and luminous big mantra without the time of despair". In this scripture, there is a story of the Buddha saving a Brahmana, and it says that if someone memorizes the Dharani, repairs the pagoda, makes a small pagoda and puts a mantra in it and serves it, he or she will extend their lives and receive many blessings.

The content of this scripture begins with the Buddha saving a Brahmana who was near death while the Buddha was in the Temple ( 精舍) of Kapilavastu (迦毘羅衛). When a Bhaglaman bhikkhu who didn't believe in Buddhism came to Buddha after he heard a coroner's statement that he would die in seven days, the Buddha said this Brahmana would die and go to hell and continue to suffer. The Brahman repented, sincerely pleaded and begged him to rescue him from the suffering of hell. Then the Buddha said, 'If you repair an old pagoda on the three streets of Kapilavastu, make a small pagoda and put a mantra in it serve it, your life will be extended and you will receive many blessings. And wherever you reincarnate, your body will not have a handicap, all your sins will disappear, and you will always be always protected by the Buddha." After he spoke, Brahmana went to the place where the old pagoda was and tried to repair it. At this time, Bodhisattva (除業 障菩薩) made this Dharani to wash away the sins of the sattva and to extend life.

Controversy
Once considered the oldest woodblock print in the world, it is the source of claims by some Korean scholars that printing was invented in Korea. This has been criticized by Chinese and Japanese historians while other Korean scholars have advised caution towards the claims. Archaeological discoveries since 1966 have pushed the existence of extant woodblock prints earlier in China, including a printed Sanskrit dharani charm in Xi'an dated to the mid-7th century and a printed Lotus Sutra dated between 690 and 699 in Turpan. The Lotus Sutra in Turpan contains the same set of Chinese characters specific to the reign of Wu Zetian as the Great Dharani Sutra in Korea. Historian Pan Jixing notes that some Korean scholars have ignored these discoveries.

References

External links 
 Great Dharani, chanting and transliteration by the Kwan Um School of Zen, September 2017.
 Official site of the National Museum of Korea
 Official site of the National Research Institute of Cultural Heritage

Mahayana sutras
National Treasures of South Korea
Silla
Cultural history of Korea
Korean Buddhist texts
8th-century books
Chinese-language literature of Korea